Beractant, also known by the trade name of Survanta, is a modified bovine pulmonary surfactant containing bovine lung extract (phospholipids, neutral lipids,
fatty acids, and bovine surfactant proteins), to which synthetic DPPC, tripalmitin and palmitic acid are added. The composition provides 25 mg/mL phospholipids, 0.5 to 1.75 mg/mL triglycerides, 1.4 to 3.5 mg/mL free fatty acids, and <1.0 mg/mL total surfactant proteins.  As an intratracheal suspension, it can be used for the prevention and treatment of neonatal respiratory distress syndrome. Survanta is manufactured by Abbvie.

Generic form 
Beraksurf is generic form of Survanta (Beractant) which is manufacturing by Tekzima.

References

External links 
 

Surfactants
AbbVie brands